Ambrose Mutinhiri (born 22 February 1944) is a Zimbabwean politician, formally served as the Minister of Youth Development and Employment Creation. A retired army commander and brigadier, he was appointed as Minister of Youth Development, Gender and Employment Creation on February 9, 2004.  He was trained in Russia during the Rhodesian Bush War. He is known for training the best calibre of soldiers during this period, even the late General Solomon Mujuru testified that he was trained by Mutinhiri.

Mutinhiri was nominated as ZANU-PF's candidate for the House of Assembly seat from Marondera, a constituency in Mashonaland East, in the March 2008 parliamentary election. According to official results, he won the seat with 4,284 votes against 2,132 votes for a candidate of the Movement for Democratic Change.

He was placed on the United States sanctions list in 2005.

Resignation

Ambrose Mutinhiri resigned as the MP for ZANU-PF after the resignation of Robert Mugabe. Mutinhire together with Sandi Moyo and Jealousy Mawarire, with the help of Grace Mugabe and Patrick Zhuwao formed the National Patriotic Front (NPF) and contested for 2018 Harmonised Elections.

Prior to elections, the NPF split with one faction linked to Robert Mugabe and the other to Grace Mugabe. Ambrose Mutinhire got less than 0.01% of the votes in the election was won by Emmerson Mnangagwa of ZANU-PF.

References 

Members of the National Assembly of Zimbabwe
Living people
Government ministers of Zimbabwe
1944 births